Khalil al-Marzooq is a Bahraini Shi'a politician and former member of the Council of Representatives. During his time in office, he served as first deputy chairman.

On February 14, 2011, al-Marzooq and 17 other MPs from Al Wefaq, the main Shi'a Islamist opposition party, resigned from their seats in parliament. Following the quelling of the unrest by the government, al-Marzooq led negotiations with the government in the Bahrain national dialogue, but he and the four other delegates from Al Wefaq withdrew from negotiations on July 17.

Al-Marzooq was arrested on September 18, 2013 for his criticism of the government. Amnesty International designated him a prisoner of conscience and called for his immediate release. A Bahraini court acquitted him for the charges of "inciting terrorism" and belonging to a terrorist organization on June 25, 2014.

On 1 February 2015, al-Marzooq was interviewed by the newly launched al-Arab News Channel, after which the channel suspended broadcasting.

References

Members of the Council of Representatives (Bahrain)
Living people
1967 births
Amnesty International prisoners of conscience held by Bahrain
Al Wefaq politicians
Bahraini prisoners and detainees